"Case of the P.T.A." is the first single by Leaders of the New School from their debut album A Future Without a Past.... It peaked at number four on the Billboard Hot Rap Singles charts. The song contains a sample from Ramsey Lewis, The Mighty Quinn.

Music video
In the video, it starts an introduction about somewhere in "Strong Island", where Busta Rhymes, Charlie Brown, and Dinco D are in high school.
Dinco drops his first verse about discussing his best & worst times on how he got in trouble with himself. Then, in the second verse, Busta drops his line about his behavior that he had so much troubles while in class. And in the final verse where Charlie Brown talks about himself being suspended from school and went to court to see the judge. As for people in the hallways running around and people dancing in the lunchroom, the video ends with the group leaving the cafeteria.

External links
 "Case of the P.T.A" music video at YouTube
 Leaders Of The New School - Case Of The PTA on Discogs

1991 singles
Leaders of the New School songs
1991 songs
Elektra Records singles
Songs written by Busta Rhymes